The canton of Arnay-le-Duc is an administrative division of the Côte-d'Or department, eastern France. Its borders were modified at the French canton reorganisation which came into effect in March 2015. Its seat is in Arnay-le-Duc.

It consists of the following communes:
 
Allerey
Antheuil
Antigny-la-Ville
Arconcey
Arnay-le-Duc
Aubaine
Aubigny-la-Ronce
Auxant
Bard-le-Régulier
Baubigny
Bellenot-sous-Pouilly
Bessey-en-Chaume
Bessey-la-Cour
Beurey-Bauguay
Blancey
Blanot
Bligny-sur-Ouche
Bouhey
Brazey-en-Morvan
La Bussière-sur-Ouche
Censerey
Chailly-sur-Armançon
Champignolles
Châteauneuf
Châtellenot
Chaudenay-la-Ville
Chaudenay-le-Château
Chazilly
Civry-en-Montagne
Clomot
Colombier
Commarin
Cormot-Vauchignon
Créancey
Crugey
Culètre
Cussy-la-Colonne
Cussy-le-Châtel
Diancey
Écutigny
Éguilly
Essey
Le Fête
Foissy
Jouey
Lacanche
Liernais
Longecourt-lès-Culêtre
Lusigny-sur-Ouche
Maconge
Magnien
Maligny
Manlay
Marcheseuil
Marcilly-Ogny
Martrois
Meilly-sur-Rouvres
Ménessaire
Mimeure
Molinot
Montceau-et-Écharnant
Mont-Saint-Jean
Musigny
Nolay
Painblanc
Pouilly-en-Auxois
La Rochepot
Rouvres-sous-Meilly
Sainte-Sabine
Saint-Martin-de-la-Mer
Saint-Pierre-en-Vaux
Saint-Prix-lès-Arnay
Santosse
Saussey
Savilly
Semarey
Sussey
Thoisy-le-Désert
Thomirey
Thorey-sur-Ouche
Thury
Val-Mont
Vandenesse-en-Auxois
Veilly
Veuvey-sur-Ouche
Vianges
Vic-des-Prés
Viévy
Villiers-en-Morvan
Voudenay

References

Cantons of Côte-d'Or